Kosalya is a genus of achilid planthoppers in the family Achilidae. There are about seven described species in Kosalya.

Species
These seven species belong to the genus Kosalya:
 Kosalya circumscripta g
 Kosalya concludens Emeljanov, 2005 c g
 Kosalya curvusanusa g
 Kosalya dilatata Chen, Yang & Wilson, 1989 c g
 Kosalya flavostrigata Distant, 1906 c g
 Kosalya improcera Chen, Yang & Wilson, 1989 c g
 Kosalya unimaculata g
Data sources: i = ITIS, c = Catalogue of Life, g = GBIF, b = Bugguide.net

References

Further reading

 
 
 
 
 

Achilidae
Auchenorrhyncha genera